The 2022 ACC men's basketball tournament (officially the 2022 New York Life ACC Men's Basketball Tournament, for sponsorship reasons) was the postseason men's basketball tournament for the 2021–22 Atlantic Coast Conference men's basketball season. It was held at the Barclays Center in Brooklyn, New York, during March 8–12, 2022. The 2022 tournament was the 69th annual edition of the tournament. The Virginia Tech Hokies won the tournament, their first ACC Tournament title and only their second conference tournament title in program history, receiving the conference's automatic bid to the 2022 NCAA tournament. The Hokies were the second ACC champion to win four tournament games to secure the title and were the lowest overall seed to win the title.

Seeds

All 15 ACC teams participate in the tournament.  Teams were seeded by conference record, with a tiebreaker system to seed teams that finished with identical conference records. Duke secured the regular season title and the first overall seed.  Notre Dame, North Carolina, and Miami were the other teams to secure double-byes.

‡ – ACC Regular Season Champions.† – Received a double-bye in the conference tournament.# – Received a single-bye in the conference tournament.

Schedule

Bracket

* – Denotes overtime period

Game summaries

First round

Second round

Quarterfinals

Semifinals

Final

Awards and honors
Tournament MVP: Hunter Cattoor, Virginia Tech

All-Tournament Teams:

First Team
 Hunter Cattoor, Virginia Tech
 Keve Aluma, Virginia Tech
 Paolo Banchero, Duke
 Wendell Moore Jr., Duke
 Kameron McGusty, Miami (FL)

Second Team
 Storm Murphy, Virginia Tech
 Darius Maddox, Virginia Tech
 Armando Bacot, UNC
 Jimmy Boeheim, Syracuse
 Quinten Post, Boston College

See also
 2022 ACC women's basketball tournament

References

Tournament
ACC men's basketball tournament
Basketball competitions in New York City
College basketball tournaments in New York (state)
Sports in Brooklyn
ACC men's basketball tournament
ACC men's basketball tournament
ACC men's basketball tournament